Perth County may refer to:

Perth County, Ontario
Perth County, Western Australia (old cadastral unit in Australia)
Perthshire, a historic county in Scotland, UK